The Camp Jordan Arena is a 4,000-seat multi-purpose arena in East Ridge, Tennessee (a suburb of Chattanooga) built in 1993.  It was formerly home to the Tennessee River Sharks of the National Indoor Football League.

References

Sports venues in Tennessee
Sports venues in Chattanooga, Tennessee
Indoor arenas in Tennessee
1993 establishments in Tennessee
Sports venues completed in 1993